Major General Douglas Henry Pratt  (7 October 1892 – 14 May 1958) was a British Army officer who served in World War I and World War II.

Military career
Douglas Henry Pratt was born in British India on 7 October 1892 and was sent to England where he was initially educated at Dover College and later entered the Royal Military College, Sandhurst, from where he was commissioned as a second lieutenant into the Royal Irish Regiment on 20 September 1911.

The first three years of Pratt's military career were spent in British India, until the British entry into World War I in August 1914. While there, he received a promotion to the rank of lieutenant on 15 April 1914.

Pratt spent the First World War in Belgium and France. By the war's end in 1918 he had been awarded the Military Cross and the Distinguished Service Order, mentioned in dispatches three times and, in 1916, had transferred to the Tank Corps, later the Royal Tank Regiment.

Continuing his military service into the interwar period, he attended the Staff College, Camberley, from 1923−1924 and served as a staff officer with the 42nd (East Lancashire) Infantry Division from 1926−1928. Pratt served on exchange with the Australian Army and was appointed as the commandant of Duntroon in 1931. He is the only non-Australian officer to have served in the role. Returning to England, he served on the staff at the War Office from 1934−1935 and later commanded the 2nd Battalion, Royal Tank Corps until 1937. The following year he returned to the War Office, this time as Assistant Director of Mechanization.

Remaining in this position until the outbreak of World War II in September 1939, he was promoted the following month to be the commander of the 1st Army Tank Brigade, which became part of the British Expeditionary Force (BEF) in France. The tank brigade fought against the Germans in Belgium and Northern France, during the counter-attack at the Battle of Arras and the Allied retreat to Dunkirk.

After being evacuated from France, Pratt was promoted to major general and sent to Washington, D.C., in the United States, to become Major General Armoured Fighting Vehicles where it was largely due to him that the Sherman tank, which was then in development, was upgraded and up-gunned to British requirements. In 1943 he became Deputy Director of the British Supply Mission in Washington. The war over in 1945, Pratt retired from the army, after a thirty-five year career, in 1946.

References

Bibliography

Buckton, Henry. Retreat: Dunkirk and the Evacuation of Western Europe. Amberley Publishing Limited, 2017.

External links
British Army Officers 1939−1945
Generals of World War II

1892 births
1958 deaths
Royal Irish Regiment (1684–1922) officers
Royal Tank Regiment officers
British Army generals of World War II
British Army personnel of World War I
Military personnel of British India
Graduates of the Royal Military College, Sandhurst
Graduates of the Staff College, Camberley
Recipients of the Military Cross
Companions of the Order of the Bath
Companions of the Distinguished Service Order
People educated at Dover College
Foreign recipients of the Legion of Merit
War Office personnel in World War II
British people in colonial India
British Army major generals